Cannons is an American indie pop band formed in 2013 in Los Angeles. The band consists of lead vocalist Michelle Joy, guitarist Ryan Clapham, and keyboardist and bassist Paul Davis.

History
Ryan Clapham and Paul Davis, who have been friends since childhood, began composing music together in their teenage years. In 2013, Joy posted an advertisement on Craigslist seeking a band looking for a singer. Clapham and Davis connected with Joy, and she was recruited as Cannons' frontwoman.

Cannons issued their first EP Up All Night in 2014. The band then released their debut album Night Drive in 2017, as well as a second EP, In a Heartbeat, the following year. Shadows, Cannons' second album, was released in 2019 by AntiFragile Music. "Fire for You", the first single from Shadows, gained significant commercial traction after being featured in a 2020 episode of the comedy-drama TV series Never Have I Ever. The band subsequently signed to Columbia Records. In early 2021, "Fire for You" reached number one on the Billboard Alternative Airplay chart. Fever Dream, the band's third album, was released in March 2022.

Discography

Studio albums

Extended plays

Singles

References

External links
 

Indie pop groups from Los Angeles
Electropop groups
Musical groups established in 2013
2013 establishments in California
Columbia Records artists